The Walsh–Healey Public Contracts Act of 1936 (41 USC §§6501-6511) is a United States labor law, passed as part of the New Deal. It is a law on basic labor rights for U.S. government contracts. It was intended to improve labor standards.

Contents
The Walsh-Healey Act that applies to U.S. government contracts exceeding $15,000 for the manufacturing or furnishing of goods. Walsh-Healey establishes overtime pay for hours worked by contractor employees in excess of 40 hours per week, and sets the minimum wage equal to the prevailing wage as determined by the Secretary of Labor. The law prohibits the employment of youths less than 16 years of age and convicts (only those currently in prison), except under certain conditions.  The Act sets standards for the use of convict labor, and job health and safety standards. The Walsh-Healey Act does not apply to commercial items.

Background
The Act was named for its Congressional sponsors, both Massachusetts Democrats, Senator David I. Walsh and Representative Arthur Healey.

The Act was based on Executive Order 6246, issued by President Franklin D. Roosevelt on August 10, 1933, which required government contractors to comply with codes of fair competition issued under the National Industrial Recovery Act (NIRA). This became moot when the Supreme Court struck down the NIRA in Schechter Poultry Corp. v. United States (1935).

See also
US labor law
Fair Labor Standards Act of 1938
Davis–Bacon Act of 1931
FAR Subpart 22.6- Walsh–Healey Public Contracts Act -http://FARSITE.HILL.AF.MIL

Notes

External links
 Federal Labor Laws, a list from Congressional Digest.
 The Department in the New Deal and World War II at the US Department of Labor.
 Text of the Act, 41 USC 35 et seq., at the Cornell Law School Legal Information Institute.
  Compliance Assistance - Walsh-Healey Public Contracts Act, US Department of Labor Wage and Hour Division.

1936 in law
74th United States Congress
United States federal labor legislation
Minimum wage law
United States federal legislation articles without infoboxes
1936 in labor relations